Coaches Tour is a program where college football coaches would visit the U.S. troops in the Middle East to provide entertainment relief. CoachesTour 2008 was the first year of the program, sponsored by Morale Entertainment, LLC. in association with Armed Forces Entertainment.

Coaches

2009 — May 27 - June 4, Germany, Turkey, Iraq, Kuwait, Djibouti and Spain

 Tommy Tuberville (Coach Emeritus) 
 Mack Brown (Texas),  2008 Coach of the Year
 Jim Tressel (Ohio State) 
 Troy Calhoun (Air Force)
 Jim Grobe (Wake Forest)
 Rick Neuheisel (UCLA) 
 Houston Nutt (Ole Miss)

2008 — May 20–26

 Mark Richt, University of Georgia
 Randy Shannon, University of Miami
 Jack Siedlecki, Yale University
 Tommy Tuberville, Auburn University
 Charlie Weis, University of Notre Dame

References

External links
 Official website: Coachestour2009

College football coaches in the United States